{{Infobox book
| name             = Death - Chuck Schuldiner's lyrics 
| title_orig       = 
| image            = Death Book Cover.jpg
| image_size = 170px
| caption          = 
| author           = Mahyar Dean
| translator       = Mahyar Dean
| illustrator      = 
| cover_artist     = 
| country          = Iran
| language         = Persian, English
| series           = 
| subject          = 
| genre            = Music
| publisher        = Parishan
| pub_date         = 2000
| english_pub_date = 
| media_type       = Print
| pages            = 298
| isbn             = 964-92534-0-8
| oclc             = 
| dewey            = 
| congress         = 
| preceded_by      = 
| followed_by      = 
}}Death - Chuck Schuldiner's lyrics''' is a book about the American death metal musical group Death.

Overview 
Published in Iran in 2000, written and translated by a classically trained musician named Mahyar Dean who later formed the power metal/progressive act Angband. 
The book includes English lyrics with Persian translations, introduction, biography and some short articles about some lyrics.

The book was sent through the site keepers of emptywords.org to Chuck Schuldiner, who in his words was "truly blown away and extremely honored by the obvious work and devotion he put into bringing the book to life".

The 2nd edition of book released in February 2017 including interviews with Tim Aymar and Bobby Koelble.

Chapters 
 Chapter 1: Introduction
 Chapter 2: Western Society &...
 Chapter 3: Around...
 Chapter 4: About...
 Chapter 5-12: Lyrics & translations
 Chapter 13: Writings

See also 
 Control Denied
 Chuck Schuldiner
 Death

References

External links 
 Death (book) on Facebook

2000 non-fiction books
Heavy metal publications
Song books